The 2015 Austrian Athletics Championships was the year's national championship in outdoor track and field for Austria. It was held on 8 and 9 August at the Franz Fekete Stadium in Kapfenberg. It served as the selection meeting for Austria at the 2015 World Championships in Athletics.

Results

Men

Women

References 

Results
 Ausschreibung
 Vorschau: Junge Medaillengewinner und WM-Team bei Staatsmeisterschaften
 Staatsmeisterschaften Kapfenberg: Alle Bewerbe und Ergebnisse, Tag 1
 Staatsmeisterschaften Kapfenberg: Alle Bewerbe und Ergebnisse, Tag 2
 Ergebnisübersicht 
 Österreichische Staatsmeisterschaften Kapfenberg 08.08.2015 - 09.08.2015 – Verfügbare Disziplinen

External links 
 Official website of the Austrian Athletics Federation 

2015
Austrian Athletics Championships
Austrian Championships
Athletics Championships
Sport in Styria
Kapfenberg